The Halfway River is a tributary of the Peace River in northeastern British Columbia, Canada.

It flows from Robb Lake, between Mount Kenny and Mount Robb, then flows east to Pink Mountain.

The Halfway River First Nation is established on the banks of the river.

See also
List of British Columbia rivers

References

Rivers of British Columbia
Peace River Country
Peace River Land District